In botany and agriculture, stunting describes a plant disease that results in dwarfing and loss of vigor. It may be caused by infectious or noninfectious means. Stunted growth can affect foliage and crop yields, as well as eating quality in edible plants.

Infectious 
A stunt caused by infectious means usually is too late to cure.
 Nematodes (eelworm)
 Fungi
 Bacteria
 Viruses

Noninfectious 
A stunt caused by noninfectious means could sometimes be remedied.
 Physical environment
 Excess of water
 Lack of water
 Too-deep planting
 Excess light
 Nutrition-related
 Soil nutrient imbalance
 Injuries
 Chemical injury
 Physical injury
 Pest feeding

See also 
 Soil retrogression and degradation
 Soil pH
 Soil types
 Ramu stunt disease, a disease of the sugarcane widespread throughout Papua New Guinea

References 

Plant pathogens and diseases